Randy Law is a former member of the Ohio House of Representatives, representing the 64th District for one term in the Ohio 126th General Assembly.

External links
https://web.archive.org/web/20100203140244/http://www.house.state.oh.us/index.php?option=com_displaymembers&task=detail&district=64

Republican Party members of the Ohio House of Representatives
Living people
21st-century American politicians
Year of birth missing (living people)